Pandit Bajinath Prasad also known as Pandit Lachhu Maharaj (1901–1978) was an Indian classical dancer and choreographer of Kathak dance. He came from a family of illustrious Kathak exponents in Lucknow, and also worked as film choreographer, Hindi cinema, most notably Mughal-e-Azam (1960) and Pakeezah (1972).
He was awarded the 1957 Sangeet Natak Akademi Award, the highest award for performing artists, conferred by the Sangeet Natak Akademi, India's National Academy for Music, Dance and Drama. He was paternal uncle of Pandit Birju Maharaj.

Early life and training
He received extensive training from Pandit Bindadin Maharaj, his uncle and the court dancer of the Nawab of Awadh, for nearly ten years. He also learnt the Pakhawaj, the Tabla and Hindustani Classical vocal music.

Career
Later, he moved to Mumbai, where the emerging film industry helped him to bring Kathak to a far wider audience. Lachhu Maharaj was acclaimed for the choreography of dance sequences in movies like Mahal (1949), Mughal-e-Azam (1960), Chhoti Chhoti Baten (1965) and Pakeezah (1972) as well as his ballets like Goutam Buddha, Chandravali  and Bharatiya Kissan. He was also the founder Director of the Kathak Kendra started by the Uttar Pradesh Government in Lucknow.

Awards
Among many prestigious awards he won were the Presidents' Award and the 1957 Sangeet Natak Akademi Award, the highest award for performing artists, conferred by the Sangeet Natak Akademi, India's National Academy for Music, Dance and Drama.

Legacy
In September 2007, a two-day festival was organized in Lucknow to celebrate his birth centenary, in presence of his wife Rama Devi,  his disciples like Nalini and Kamalini, a book on him was also released and students of the dance institution he founded, Kathak Kendra staged a ballet, Megh Malhar.

See also
 List of Kathak dancers

References

External links
 

Kathak exponents
1901 births
1978 deaths
Artists from Lucknow
Indian classical choreographers
Indian film choreographers
Performers of Indian classical dance
Indian choreographers
Teachers of Indian classical dance
Recipients of the Sangeet Natak Akademi Award
Dancers from Uttar Pradesh
20th-century Indian dancers